John Munduga (born 15 January 1961) is a Ugandan boxer. He competed in the men's light welterweight event at the 1980 Summer Olympics.

References

1961 births
Living people
Ugandan male boxers
Olympic boxers of Uganda
Boxers at the 1980 Summer Olympics
Sportspeople from Kampala
Light-welterweight boxers